Michael Julian Ingall (born in Lincoln) is the Chairman, CEO, and founder of Allied London Group, an award-winning multi platform real estate investment, development and services group. Ingall is also the founder of All Work & Social, All Plus, Adept Corporate Service, Agilis, and most recently Versa Studios.

A qualified chartered surveyor, Ingall started his career managing various parts of London on the Crown and Pollen Estates for Drivers Jonas, he then moved on to retail development consultancy, joined the Board of Raglan Properties in 1990 and joined the Board of Allied London in 1995.

At Allied London he was responsible for the complete restructuring of the business, and earned a reputation for tackling complex, difficult and pioneering developments, as well as the restoration of listed historic buildings and iconic landmarks such as Herbal House (London), The Brunswick Centre (London), The Bonded Warehouse (Manchester) Malthouse (Leeds), and ongoing  work to the former London Road Fire Station (Manchester).

His and Allied London’s contributions to the property business have been recognised consistently with industry awards over the last twenty years. Spinningfields in Manchester is considered a particularly key development, and is widely credited with creating a commercial heartland for Manchester.

He led the privatisation of Allied London in September 2000. In 2014 Ingall was listed in the politics section of Debrett's 500, which lists Britain's 500 most influential people.

Awards 
 2000 Property Week's Developer of the Decade 
 2003 Property Week Awards North West, Property Deal of the Year
 2003 Property Week Awards North West, Property Personality of the Year
 2004 Manchester Society of Architects and Design Awards, Best New Commercial Building
 2005 Property Week Property Award, Regeneration Award
 2005 Royal  Institute of British Architects Awards, Active in Architecture Award
 2006 Royal Institution of Chartered Surveyors Northwest Award, Commercial     Category
 2006 Property Week Property Awards, Regeneration Award
 2006 Manchester City Council Award, Built in Quality Award
 2007 North West Property Awards, Commercial Development of the Year
 2007 North West Property Awards, Best Design-Led Project
 2007 North West Property Awards, Occupier of the Year
 2007 Manchester City Council Award, Built in Quality Award
 2007 Construction News, Green Major Project of the Year Award
2007 British Council of Shopping Centres Gold Award, Best in Town Retail Scheme
 2007 Regeneration and Renewal Awards, Best Heritage led project
 2008 Honorary Fellow of the Royal Institute of British Architects
 2008  North West Property Award 2008, Best Design-Led Project of the Year
 2008  North West Property Award 2008, Commercial Developer of the Year
 2008  North West Regional Structural Award, Large Project Award
 2008 Royal Institute of British Architects Regional Award Northwest, RIBA Regional     Award
 2008 Royal Institute of British Architects Sustainability Award, RIBA     Sustainability Award
 2008 The Chicago Athenaeum: Museum of Architecture and Design 2008, International Architecture Award
 2009 Property Week Award, Developer of the Decade
 2009 Property Week Award, Development of the     Decade
 2009 Northwest Property Week Award, Commercial Development of the Year
 2009  Property Week Offices Award Developer of the Year
 2009  Property Week Offices Award, Best Development Outside Central London
 2009  Manchester City Council Award, Built in Quality Award
 2009  Manchester City Council Award, Technical Innovation Award
 2009  Manchester City Council Award, Sustainable Construction Award
 2010  Royal Institution of Chartered Surveyors Northwest Award, Design & Innovation Commendation
 2017  The Academy of  Urbanism Award, The Brunswick
 2017  International Property Awards, London Development Marketing
 2018  Insider North West Property Awards 2018, Commercial Development of the Year
 2019  British Council for Offices North Awards Committee Chair’s Award
 2019 AJ  Architecture Awards, Leisure Project of the Year
 2020 Festival of Place / The Pineapples, Best Completed Place : Leeds Dock

Buildings 

 Spinningfields Manchester
 Leeds Dock Leeds
 Enterprise City Manchester
 Brunswick Centre London
 Herbal House London
 CJC Manchester
 Bonded Warehouse Manchester
 XYZ building Manchester
 Cannon Street London
 London Road Fire Station (completion 2022), Manchester
 ABC buildings, Manchester
 Manchester Studios
 Manchester Goods Yard (completion 2022)
 Globe & Simpson, Manchester (completion 2022)

Projects 

 Brunswick London
 Skypark Glasgow
 Spinningfields Manchester
 St John's Manchester

Further reading

External links 
 Allied London

1959 births
British real estate businesspeople
Fellows of the Royal Institute of British Architects
Living people